Bantu Philosophy (La philosophie bantoue in French) is a 1945 book written by Placide Tempels which argues that the Bantu peoples of Sub-Saharan Africa have an implicit philosophy, and attempts to describe its basic tenets.

Overview
In his book, Tempels argues that the African philosophical categories can be identified through the categories inherent to language. According to Tempels, the primary metaphysical category in the thought of Bantu-speaking societies is Force. That is, reality is dynamic, and being is force.

Tempels argues that there are three possible views of the relationship between being and force.
 Being as distinct from force, that is, beings may have force or may not.
 Force as part of being, that is, being is more than force, but dependent upon it.
 Being is Force, that is, the two are one and the same.

He argues that members of Bantu-speaking cultures hold the last view of force. Specifically:

Tempels argues that as a result of this fundamental difference in categories, the African life of the mind is structured around understanding and defining Force, which contrasts sharply with the Western enterprise of understanding and defining Being.

See also 
 Ben Dekker

Bibliography
 Mubabinge Bilolo, La Sémiologie d'un hommage au Révérend Père Placide Tempels. In : Ethique et Société. Actes de la 3ème Semaine Philosophique de Kinshasa, avril 1978 (Coll. Recherches Philosophiques Africaines, 5), Kinshasa, 1980, p. 307-331.
 Mubabinge Bilolo,  La Philosophie Nègre dans l'œuvre d'Emile Possoz. I. de 1928-1945, in Revue Africaine de Théologie, V, 10 (1981), p. 197-225.
 Mubabinge Bilolo,  L'impact d'Emile Possoz sur P. Tempels. Introduction au destin du possozianisme. In Revue Africaine de Théologie, 11 (1982), p. 27-57.
 Fr. BONTINCK, Aux origines de La philosophie bantoue, Kinshasa/Limete, FTC, 1985.
 SMET, A.J.,  Histoire de la philosophie africaine contemporaine: Courants et problèmes (Cours et documents, 5). Kinshasa-Limete, Départ. de PRA, FTC, 1980, 299 p. - Bibliographie, p. 5-14 et 277-292.

External links
Full English text§

1945 non-fiction books
Philosophy books
Bantu mythology
Belgian Congo
Christianity in Africa
Books about the Democratic Republic of the Congo